Kevin Kallaugher (born March 23, 1955 in Norwalk, Connecticut) is a political cartoonist for The Economist and the Baltimore Sun. He cartoons using the pen name, KAL.

Editorial cartoon career
Kallaugher attended Fairfield College Preparatory School and graduated in 1973. Kallaugher graduated from Harvard College with honors in visual and environmental studies in 1977. After that, he undertook a cycling tour of the British Isles, joining the Brighton Bears Basketball Club as a player and coach. When the club ran into financial trouble, Kallaugher began drawing caricatures of tourists on Brighton Pier and in Trafalgar Square.

In 1978 Kallaugher became the first resident cartoonist in the then 135-year history of The Economist. He spent the following 10 years in London working for such publications as The Observer, The Sunday Telegraph, Today and The Mail on Sunday.

A picture of Indira Gandhi by Kal was considered offensive by Indian authorities in 1984, leading to the destruction of the printed editions of the newspaper in the country.

Kallaugher returned to the U.S. in 1988, becoming the editorial cartoonist for The Baltimore Sun. Over the course of his 17 years at the newspaper up to 2006, he drew more than 4000 cartoons for The Sun while also drawing two cartoons per week for The Economist. Kallaugher's work for The Economist includes over 120 illustrated covers. He left The Sun in 2006, but returned in 2012.

In 1995, Kallaugher was invited by the Walters Art Museum to help curate the celebrated exhibition "Worth a Thousand Words: A Picture of Contemporary Political Satire". In 2006, the Walters mounted a major retrospective exhibition of Kallaugher's cartoons titled "Mightier than The Sword; The Satirical Pen of KAL". Kallaugher's work has also been exhibited at the Tate Gallery in London and the Library of Congress in Washington, D.C.  He has had one-man exhibitions in London, New York City, Washington, D.C., and Baltimore.

Syndication

KAL's work for The Sun and The Economist has appeared in more than 100 publications worldwide, including Le Monde, Der Spiegel, Pravda, Krokodil, Daily Yomiuri, The Australian, The International Herald Tribune, The Washington Post, The New York Times, The New Yorker, Time, Newsweek and U.S. News & World Report. His cartoons are distributed worldwide by Cartoonarts International and the New York Times Syndicate.

Awards and honors
Kallaugher has won many awards for his work; most recently, the 2015 Herblock Prize for editorial cartooning. In 2005, he received the Nast Prize as presented by the town of Landau, Germany. In 2004 he won the Gillray Goblet for Cartoon of the Year as presented by the Political Cartoon Society of Great Britain.  In 1999, 2002 and 2005 he won the Thomas Nast Award, presented by the Overseas Press Club of America, and in 2002 he was awarded the Berryman Award, presented by the National Press Foundation. In 1996 he won the Grafica Internazionale Award at the International Festival of Satire in Pisa, Italy. In 1990 he was awarded the award for Best Editorial Cartoon at the Witty World International Cartoon Festival in Budapest, Hungary and the 1982 Feature Cartoonist of the Year Award as presented by the Cartoonist Club of Great Britain.

In 1999, The World Encyclopedia of Cartoons said of him: "Commanding a masterful style, Kallaugher stands among the premier caricaturists of the (twentieth) century."

Kallaugher is past President of the Association of American Editorial Cartoonists and Cartoons Rights Network, an international human rights organization dedicate to the plight of cartoonists at risk.

Books
Kallaugher published a collection of his Economist drawings entitled Drawn from The Economist (1988) and four collections of his Baltimore Sun cartoons entitled KALtoons (1992), KAL Draws a Crowd (1996), KAL Draws the Line (2000) and KAL Draws Criticism (2006). A new collection, Daggers Drawn: 35 Years of KAL Cartoons in The Economist, was published in 2013.

In February 2010 KAL launched his first iPhone app, based on his most recent cartoon collection KAL Draws Criticism, with an additional bonus section.

Animation
As part of his senior thesis at Harvard, Kallaugher completed a 13-minute animated film "In The Days of Disgustus" which featured characters from his weekly cartoon strip by the same name that ran in The Harvard Crimson. In 1986, Kallaugher worked with the animator Richard Williams to produce "No Bias", an award-winning 30 second television commercial for the Today newspaper in Great Britain. In 2004 Kallaugher teamed up with animator Gary Leib at Twinkle studio to create flash animation video for ABC's Nightline and CNN's Lou Dobbs Tonight.

In 2006, Kallaugher was named Artist-in-Residence at the Imaging Research Center at the University of Maryland, Baltimore County. With the IRC, Kallaugher has pioneered the development of 3D digital caricatures that can be animated in Real-time. His first character, The Digital Dubya, made its world premier at a live press conference at the Walters Art Museum in June 2006. The World Wide Web premier of his digital animation was in March 2007 when The Economist commissioned a web video to coincide with the launch of a gallery of KAL's cartoons on the magazine's website.

Kallaugher launched a Maryland-based animation company, Kaltoons LLC, in 2007. Kaltoons first video, Dancin' Dubya was released online in August 2007.

References

External links

 Official website of Kevin Kallaugher
 Selection of animations by KAL
 The Economist KAL's gallery since 2006
 Best of KAL, The Economist, Apr 4th 2008
 Video: KAL discusses these drawings and his career at The Economist
 Interview of KAL by The Economist on YouTube 18 Feb 2022
 The Official Page of the iKal Book iPhone app
 
 

American editorial cartoonists
The Economist people
1955 births
Living people
Harvard College alumni
People from Norwalk, Connecticut
Artists from Connecticut
Fairfield College Preparatory School alumni